Artyom Sergeyevich Samsonov (born 5 January 1994) is a Russian football player who plays as a right-back or defensive midfielder for FC Kaluga.

Club career
He made his debut in the Russian Professional Football League for FC Spartak-2 Moscow on 16 July 2013 in a game against FC Dynamo Bryansk.

He made his Russian Premier League debut for FC Spartak Moscow on 5 November 2017 in a game against FC Ufa.

On 10 January 2018, he signed with FC SKA-Khabarovsk.

Career statistics

References

1994 births
Sportspeople from Kaluga
Living people
Russian footballers
Russia youth international footballers
Russia under-21 international footballers
Association football midfielders
FC Spartak Moscow players
FC Spartak-2 Moscow players
FC SKA-Khabarovsk players
FC Rotor Volgograd players
FC Shinnik Yaroslavl players
Russian Premier League players
Russian First League players
Russian Second League players